Old Partner (lit. "Cowbell Sound") is a 2008 South Korean documentary film directed by Lee Chung-ryoul. Set in the small rural town of Hanul-ri in Sangun-myeon, Bonghwa County, North Gyeongsang Province, the film focuses on the relationship between a 40-year-old cow and an old farmer in his 80s.

The film was a surprise success. It attracted over 2.93 million viewers, setting the record for the highest grossing independent film in Korean film history. It won the PIFF Mecenat Award at the Pusan International Film Festival and the Audience Award at the Korean Independent Film Awards. Lee Chung-ryoul became the first independent film director to receive the Best New Director award at the Baeksang Arts Awards.

Awards and nominations
Won the PIFF Mecenat Award at the 2008 Pusan International Film Festival
Won the Audience Award at the 2008 Seoul Independent Film Festival
Nominated for the World Cinema Documentary at the 2009 Sundance Film Festival
Won the Audience Award at the Korean Independent Film Awards
Won Best New Director at the 2009 Baeksang Arts Awards
Won Best International Documentary at the 2009 Italian Environmental Film Festival

References

External links 
  
 
 
 

2008 films
South Korean documentary films
South Korean independent films
2000s Korean-language films
2008 documentary films
Documentary films about agriculture
Films about cattle
Documentary films about South Korea
2008 directorial debut films
2008 independent films
2000s South Korean films